Clement Town is a cantonment town in Dehradun, Dehradun district in the state of Uttarakhand, India. Saharanpur and Haridwar are  respectively. It also borders Rajaji National Park and is home to several renowned institutions. Schools such as Raja Ram Mohan Roy Academy and St. Mary's are in the neighbourhood. Country singer Bobby Cash resides in Clement Town.

Geography
The climate is similar to Dehradun.

Demographics
As of 2001 India census, Clement Town had a population of 19,634. Males constitute 58% of the population and females 42%. Clement Town has an average literacy rate of 85%, higher than the national average of 59.5%: male literacy is 92% and, female literacy is 79%.  In Clement Town, 13% of the population is under 6 years of age.

Government and politics 
Clement town is a Category-II cantonment, and deemed municipality administered by a cantonment board under the Ministry of Defence.

The municipal board consists of 14 members, of which seven are corporators elected from each ward in the municipality .

Education
After the establishment of Indian Military Academy (IMA) at Dehradun in 1932, the Joint Services Wing (JSW) (National War Academy) was set up here on 15 December 1948, under the leadership of Colonel Kamta Prasad, which was renamed as National Defence Academy (NDA) on 1 January 1950, though in December 1954, the NDA was shifted to Khadakwasla near Poona. Graphic Era University,
St. Patrick's Academy, and
Army Public School are also located in Clement Town.

Places to visit

Mindrolling Monastery 
A large Tibetan settlement and the World's Largest Stupa, of the re-established Mindroling Monastery from Tibet, is situated in Clement Town, which was inaugurated on 28 October 2002 and is surrounded by a  garden. It is the highest Mindroling Monastery in the world

Tibetan Children's Home
Inspired by the 14th Dalai Lama's TCV (Tibetan Children's Village), The Tibetan Children's Home was established in Dhondupling Tibetan Colony, Clement Town, Dehra Dun, India on 18 March 1991. TCH was originally funded by the eleven-member Board of Directors, then was bought out by Mr. Sonam Singhe in 2004. This is a not-for profit boarding school, that aids Tibetan children to get the education they need. TCH provides food, shelter, tutoring and transportation for the children living under poverty. Those that cannot afford to pay for these expenses are given grants and donations from charities such as Parimita Charitable Trust, the Tibetan Homes Foundation, the Tibetan Children's Fund, the Chenrezig Fund, the Social Justice Fund of the First Unitarian Society of Madison, and Lake Side Church. In 1992, the 14th Dalai Lama visited TCH and gave it his blessing and support. He praised the initiative for the work that has been done and presented TCH with a notable gift to help develop the facilities.

References

External links
Some Photographs of the Mindrolling Monastery, Clement Town, Dehradun

Cities and towns in Dehradun district
Tourism in Uttarakhand
Cantonments of India
Cantonments of British India
Stupas in India